The 1885 Iowa gubernatorial election was held on November 3, 1885. Republican nominee William Larrabee defeated Democratic nominee Charles E. Whiting with 50.76% of the vote.

General election

Candidates
Major party candidates
William Larrabee, Republican
Charles E. Whiting, Democratic 

Other candidates
James Michelwait, Prohibition
Elias Doty, Greenback

Results

References

1885
Iowa